Trading Secrets is a 1998 novel by the French writer Paule Constant. It received the Prix Goncourt.

See also
 1998 in literature
 Contemporary French literature

References

1998 French novels
Prix Goncourt winning works
Éditions Gallimard books